Armadale Station is a railway station on the South Western Railway, 30 kilometres from Perth station serving the suburb of Armadale, Brookdale and Haynes. It is the terminating point for Transperth Armadale line services and a calling point for Transwa Australind services.

History
The original station opened on 2 May 1893 when the South Western Railway opened from Claisebrook to Pinjarra. As part of the electrification of the line in the early 1990s, a new station was built with the former signal box relocated to the Armadale Tourist Centre. On 6 November 2004 another new station opened.

On 15 July 1907 Armadale became a junction station when the Spearwood-Armadale line opened. This line closed on 23 January 1964.

Services
Armadale station is the terminus for Transperth Armadale Line services. It is also served by Transwa Australind services to Bunbury. For a time, The Australind did stop at Kelmscott, however this was reverted in April 1992.

The station saw 497,748 passengers in the 2013-14 financial year.

Beyond the station is a turnaround siding.

Platforms

Bus routes

Armadale is also served by Transwa services to Perth Coach Terminal, Albany and Esperance.

References

External links
Gallery History of Western Australian Railways & Stations

Armadale, Western Australia
Armadale and Thornlie lines
Railway stations in Perth, Western Australia
Railway stations in Australia opened in 1893
Bus stations in Perth, Western Australia